Emily Raboteau is an American fiction writer, essayist, and Professor of Creative Writing at the City College of New York.

Early life
Raboteau grew up in New Jersey, the daughter of Princeton professor Albert Raboteau. She received an undergraduate degree at Yale University and an MFA from New York University.

Career
Her writing has been published in The Guardian, Oxford American, The Believer, Guernica, Best American Short Stories, Best American Nonrequired Reading, Best American Mystery Stories and Best African American Essays.  She has received the Pushcart Prize, the Chicago Tribune's Nelson Algren Award, a New York Foundation for the Arts Fellowship, and a Literature Fellowship from the National Endowment for the Arts.

Her first novel The Professor's Daughter was published in 2005. Her second book, Searching for Zion: The Quest for Home in the African Diaspora, a work of creative nonfiction, was published in 2013.

Personal life
Raboteau is married to novelist Victor LaValle and lives in New York City. They have two children.

References

21st-century American novelists
American women novelists
Living people
Year of birth missing (living people)
New York University alumni
21st-century American women writers
American Book Award winners